, is a Japanese artist, singer-songwriter, and arranger based on Japan.

Biography 
marhy showed a talent for song and dance from the age of 2. 
At 4 years of age, she began to take keyboard lessons.  By the age of 12, she had composed and won several awards such as a composer award for electric keyboard.
In October 2004, together with her sister, Sora Izumikawa, marhy established a group called "DAUGHTER" and released an album of the same name.
In August 2006 and February 2007, marhy as a solo artist, released two singles "Clover" and "CROSS ROAD" (TV Tokyo animation "Otogi-Jūshi Akazukin" Ending theme). She is not only a well known Japanese singer, but also provides musical support to other artists.

Discography 
Vocals and chorus （as marhy）
 PoPoLoCrois (Poporokuroisu Monogatari) – Bouken no Hajimari　Theme Song "Hitomi no Tobira" / Vocal
 Licca-chan　Voice Over Vocal
 Jamzvillage　Live Chorus
 sugizo Compilation Chorus
 Sona "waltz", "Ameni Utaeba" / Chorus, Live Chorus
 Boku no Natsuyasumi 3（PlayStation 3）　Theme Song "Himawari Musume " Vocal
 "Bohemian Jazz Cooking"  Queen JAZZ coverage / Album Vocalist
Singer & Songwriting – DAUGHTER –
 sora & marhy = DAUGHTER feat. the fascinations　album Rock meets Jazz  "aMERICAN SWING ”

Works for others 
Songwriting – Artists –
 Sowelu "Shine "Mizuho Bank lottery, Jingle Writer / Composition
 Sona "Shigatsu ", "COCOA " / Composition
 Masaki Toriyama "Utakatano Koibito", "Dorobou Neko " / Composition
 Takako Matsu "Welcome Back" / Composition
 YeLLOW Generation "Utakata" TBS Drama "Hot Man"  Sub theme song / Composition
 Miwako Okuda "love you" TV Tokyo "Ikinari Kekkon Seikatsu" Ending theme / Composition, Lyrics（Collaboration）, "Tsukiga Suki ", "Ameno Oto ",  "Habataite Toriwa Kieru" / Composition
 Yukari Tamura "Tsubomino Mamade", "Kokorono Tobira", "Nijino Kiseki" /Lyrics, Composition, Arrangement, "Primary Tale", "Eternity " /Lyrics, Composition, Arrangement, "Tsukino Melody" /Lyrics, "Oikaze ", "Sweetest Love", "Air Shooter" /Lyrics, Composition, "Jellyfish" / Composition, "YOURS EVER" /Lyrics, Composition, Arrangement
 Ex.Bold "Story" / Composition, Chorus
 Yui Ichikawa "Fu Fu Fu Boyfriend" / Composition, Chorus
 0930 "VIVA Seishun" /Lyrics, Composition, Arrangement
 Mika Goto "Sunadokei" /Lyrics, Composition, Arrangement, "tokage", "Endeavor " / Composition
 Sora "Niji wo Wataru Kaze no Youni" / Composition
 Atsuko Enomoto "GoodLuck GoodDay " Composition
 Kaori Kawamura "Butterfly " Composition/Lyrics（Collaboration）
 Sora Izumikawa "Lights" Composition, in the album "11" (juuichi)

Songwriting – Anime –
 Steel Angel Kurumi( Kōtetsu Tenshi Kurumi) (Anime) Theme Song "Egao Kudasai" / Composition, Chorus, Chorus arrangement
 Best Student Council (Gokujō Seitokai) (Anime) Compilation "Only Place", "my friend" /Lyrics, Composition, Arrangement
 Kamisama Kazoku (Anime) OP "Brand New Morning Come" /Arrangement
 Kamisama Kazoku (Anime) Ending theme "Toshokandewa Oshietekurenai Tenshibo Himitsu" / Composition, Arrangement
 Otogi-Jūshi Akazukin (Anime) Compilation "Sympathy" Composition, Arrangement
 Yes! PreCure 5 Ending theme "Kirakira Shichatte My True Love! " Composition, Collaboration Arrangement
 Fresh Pretty Cure! (Anime) Ending theme "You make me happy! " Composition
 Kōtetsu Sangokushi (Anime) Compilation "Koubou" Composition, Arrangement
 HeartCatch PreCure! (Anime) Ending theme "Heart Catch Paradise" Composition

References and notes

External links 
 marhy（revenjam Factory Inc.）（official）
 DAUGHTER（official）
 Official Website (SCE) 

21st-century Japanese composers
21st-century Japanese singers
Japanese women composers
Japanese women singer-songwriters
Japanese singer-songwriters
Japanese keyboardists
Japanese music arrangers
Living people
Sony Interactive Entertainment games
21st-century Japanese women singers
Year of birth missing (living people)
21st-century women composers